Gildas (Breton: Gweltaz; c. 450/500 – c. 570) — also known as Gildas the Wise or Gildas Sapiens — was a 6th-century British monk best known for his scathing religious polemic De Excidio et Conquestu Britanniae, which recounts the history of the Britons before and during the coming of the Saxons. He is one of the best-documented figures of the Christian church in the British Isles during the sub-Roman period, and was renowned for his Biblical knowledge and literary style. In his later life, he emigrated to Brittany where he founded a monastery known as Saint-Gildas-de-Rhuys.

Hagiography
Differing versions of the Life of Saint Gildas exist, but both agree that he was born in what is now Scotland on the banks of the River Clyde, and that he was the son of a royal family. These works were written in the eleventh and twelfth centuries and are regarded by scholars as unhistorical. He is now thought to have his origins farther south. In his own work, he claims to have been born the same year as the Battle of Mount Badon. He was educated at a monastic centre, possibly Cor Tewdws in South Wales under St Illtud, where he chose to forsake his royal heritage and embrace monasticism. He became a renowned teacher, converting many to Christianity and founding numerous churches and monasteries throughout Britain and Ireland. He is thought to have made a pilgrimage to Rome before emigrating to Brittany, where he took on the life of a hermit. However, his life of solitude was short-lived, and pupils soon sought him out and begged him to teach them. He eventually founded a monastery for these students at Saint-Gildas-de-Rhuys in Brittany, where he wrote De Excidio Britanniae, criticising British rulers and exhorting them to put off their sins and embrace true Christian faith. He is thought to have died at Rhuys, and was buried there.

Rhuys Life
The First Life of Gildas was written by an unnamed monk at the monastery which Gildas founded in Rhuys, Brittany in the 9th century. According to this tradition, Gildas is the son of Caunus, king of Alt Clut in the Hen Ogledd, the Brythonic-speaking region of northern Britain. He had four brothers; his brother Cuillum ascended to the throne on the death of his father, and the rest became monks. Gildas was sent as a child to the College of Theodosius (Cor Tewdws) in Glamorgan, under the care of St Illtud, and was a companion of St Samson of Dol and St Paul Aurelian. His master Illtud loved him tenderly and taught him with special zeal. He was supposed to be educated in liberal arts and divine scripture, but elected to study only holy doctrine, and to forsake his noble birth in favour of a religious life.

After completing his studies under Illtud, Gildas went to Ireland where he was ordained as a priest. He returned to his native lands in northern Britain where he acted as a missionary, preaching to the pagan people and converting many of them to Christianity. He was then asked by Ainmericus, high king of Ireland (Ainmuire mac Sétnai, 566–569), to restore order to the church in Ireland, which had altogether lost the Christian faith. Gildas obeyed the king's summons and travelled all over the island, converting the inhabitants, building churches, and establishing monasteries. He then travelled to Rome and Ravenna where he performed many miracles, including slaying a dragon while in Rome. Intending to return to Britain, he instead settled on the Isle of Houat off Brittany where he led a solitary, austere life. At around this time, he also preached to Nonnita (Non), the mother of Saint David, while she was pregnant with the saint.

He was eventually sought out by those who wished to study under him, and was entreated to establish a monastery in Brittany, which he did at a place now known as Saint-Gildas-de-Rhuys. Finally, he built an oratory against an overhanging rock on the bank of the River Blavetum (River Blavet), near Pontivy, to resume his contemplative life. Fragments of letters that he wrote reveal that he composed a Rule for monastic life that was somewhat less austere than the Rule written by Saint David. Ten years after leaving Britain, he wrote an epistolary book in which he reproved five of the British kings. He died at Rhuys on 29 January 570, and his body was placed on a boat and allowed to drift, according to his wishes. Three months later, on 11 May, men from Rhuys found the ship in a creek with the body of Gildas still intact. They took the body back to Rhuys and buried it there.

Llancarfan Life: Gildas and King Arthur
The second "Life" of Gildas was written by Caradoc of Llancarfan, a friend of Geoffrey of Monmouth and his Norman patrons. However, Llancarfan's work is most probably historically inaccurate, as his hagiographies tend towards the fictitious, rather than the strictly historical. Llancarfan's "Life" was written in the 12th century, and includes many elements of what have come to be known as mythical pseudo-histories, involving King Arthur, Guinevere, and Glastonbury Abbey, leading to the general opinion that this "life" is less historically accurate than the earlier version. 

In the Llancarfan Life, Gildas is presented as the son of Nau, king of Scotia. Nau had 24 sons, all victorious warriors. Gildas studied literature as a youth, before leaving his homeland for Gaul, where he studied for seven years. When he returned, he brought back an extensive library with him, and was sought after as a master teacher. He became the most renowned teacher in all of the three kingdoms of Britain. Gildas was a subject of the mythical King Arthur, whom he loved and desired to obey. However, his 23 brothers were always rising up against their rightful king, and his eldest brother, Hueil, would submit to no rightful high king, not even Arthur. Hueil would often swoop down from Scotland to fight battles and carry off spoils, and during one of these raids, Hueil was pursued and killed by King Arthur. When news of his brother's murder reached Gildas in Ireland, he was greatly grieved, but was able to forgive Arthur, and pray for the salvation of his soul. Gildas then travelled to Britain, where he met Arthur face to face, and kissed him as he prayed for forgiveness, and Arthur accepted penance for murdering Gildas' brother.

After this, Gildas taught at the school of St Cadoc before retiring to a secret island for seven years. Pirates from the Orkney Islands came and sacked his island, carrying off goods and his friends as slaves. In distress, he left the island, and came to Glastonbury, then ruled by Melvas, King of the 'Summer Country' (Gwlad yr Haf, Somerset). Gildas intervened between King Arthur and Melvas, who had abducted and raped Arthur's wife Guinevere and brought her to his stronghold at Glastonbury. Arthur soon arrived to besiege him, but, the peacemaking saint persuaded Melvas to release Guinevere and the two kings made peace. Then desiring to live a hermit's life, Gildas built a hermitage devoted to the Trinity on the banks of the river at Glastonbury. He died, and was buried at Glastonbury Abbey, in the floor of St Mary's Church.

The Llancarfan Life contains the earliest surviving appearance of the abduction of Guinevere episode, common in later Arthurian literature. Huail's enmity with Arthur was also apparently a popular subject in medieval Britain: he is mentioned as an enemy of Arthur's in the Welsh prose tale Culhwch and Olwen, written around 1100. A strongly held tradition in North Wales places the beheading of Gildas' brother Huail at Ruthin, where what claims to be the execution stone (Maen Huail) has been preserved in the town square. Another brother of Gildas, Celyn ap Caw, was based in the north-east corner of Anglesey.

De Excidio et Conquestu Britanniae

Gildas is best known for his polemic De Excidio et Conquestu Britanniae, which recounts the sub-Roman history of Britain, and which is the only substantial source for history of this period written by a near-contemporary, although it is not intended to be an objective chronicle.

The work is a sermon in three parts condemning the acts of his contemporaries, both secular and religious. The first part consists of Gildas' explanation for his work and a brief narrative of Roman Britain from its conquest under the Principate to Gildas' time. He describes the doings of the Romans and the Groans of the Britons, in which the Britons make one last request for military aid from the departed Roman military. He excoriates his fellow Britons for their sins, while at the same time lauding heroes such as Ambrosius Aurelianus, whom he is the first to describe as a leader of the resistance to the Saxons. He mentions the victory at the Battle of Mons Badonicus, a feat attributed to King Arthur in later texts, though Gildas does not mention who led the battle.

Part two consists of a condemnation of five British kings, Constantine, Aurelius Conanus, Vortiporius, Cuneglas, and Maelgwn. As it is the only contemporary information about them, it is of particular interest to scholars of British history. Part three is a similar attack on the clergy of the time.

The works of Gildas, including the Excidio, can be found in volume 69 of the Patrologia Latina.

De Excidio was usually dated to the 540s, but the historian Guy Halsall inclines to an "early Gildas" c. 490. Cambridge historian Karen George offered a date range of c. 510–530 AD.

Veneration
Gildas' relics were venerated in the abbey which he founded in Rhuys, until the 10th century, when they were removed to Berry. In the 18th century, they were said to be moved to the cathedral at Vannes and then hidden during the French Revolution. The various relics survived the revolution and have all since been returned to Saint-Gildas-de-Rhuys where they are visible at various times of the year at a dedicated "treasury" in the village. The body of Saint Gildas (minus the pieces incorporated into various reliquaries) is buried behind the altar in the church of Saint Gildas de Rhuys.

The gold and silver covered relics of Saint Gildas include:

 A reliquary head containing parts of the saint's skull 
 An arm reliquary containing bone pieces, topped with a blessing hand 
 A reliquary femur and knee 

The embroidered mitre supposedly worn by Gildas is also kept with these relics. Gildas is the patron saint of several churches and monasteries in Brittany, and his feast day is celebrated on 29 January.

Further traditions
Gildas is credited with a hymn called the Lorica, or Breastplate, a prayer for deliverance from evil, which contains specimens of Hiberno-Latin. A proverb is also attributed to Gildas mab y Gaw in the Englynion y Clyweid in Llanstephan MS. 27.

In Bonedd y Saint, Gildas is recorded as having three sons and a daughter. Gwynnog ap Gildas and Noethon ap Gildas are named in the earliest tracts, together with their sister Dolgar. Another son, Tydech, is named in a later document. Iolo Morganwg adds Saint Cenydd to the list.

The scholar David Dumville suggests that Gildas was the teacher of Finnian of Moville, who in turn was the teacher of St Columba of Iona.

See also 
 Gildas the Albanian
 Procopius

Notes

References

Bibliography 

 
 — English translation
 — in Latin
 
 

 Miller, Molly. "Bede's use of Gildas." English Historical Review (1975): 241–261. JSTOR

Further reading 
 Luca Larpi, Prolegomena to a New Edition of Gildas Sapiens «De Excidio Britanniae», Firenze, Sismel – Edizioni del Galluzzo, 2012 (:it:Società internazionale per lo studio del Medioevo latino)
 Winterbottom, Michael ed. and trans., (1978) Gildas: The Ruin of Britain and Other Works, Phillimore, Chichester

External links

 
 
 
 
 
The Life of Gildas by A Monk of Rhuys.
The Life of Gildas by Caradoc of Llancarfan.
Gildas and The History of the Britons commentary from The Cambridge History of English and American Literature, Volume 1, 1907–21.
Vortigernstudies: Gildas (sources)

500 births
570 deaths
6th-century Christian saints
6th-century historians
Arthurian characters
Arthurian legend
Medieval Welsh literature
Northern Brythonic saints
Southwestern Brythonic saints
Sub-Roman writers
Medieval Welsh saints
Medieval Breton saints
6th-century Welsh people
Last of the Romans
6th-century Latin writers
6th-century Breton people